The Webb S. Knight House, at 514 7th St. in Spearfish, South Dakota, is a "a very simple version of Queen Anne" style house built in 1892.  It was listed on the National Register of Historic Places in 1989.

It is a frame house on a stone foundation, with clapboard siding.

References

Houses on the National Register of Historic Places in South Dakota
Queen Anne architecture in South Dakota
Houses completed in 1892
Lawrence County, South Dakota